Europe of the Peoples (EdP) was a Spanish electoral list in the European Parliament election in 2004 made up from regionalist parties.

Composition

Electoral performance

European Parliament

Defunct political party alliances in Spain
Regionalist parties in Spain